Joy is an unincorporated community in southwest Dent County, in the U.S. state of Missouri.

The community is located on Missouri Route E just east of Missouri Route 119. Salem is approximately eleven miles to the northeast and Montauk State Park is about four miles to the south. Licking in adjacent Texas County is about nine miles to the southwest.

History
A post office called Joy was established in 1890, and remained in operation until 1954. The townspeople were overjoyed when they secured the post office, hence the name Joy.

References

Unincorporated communities in Dent County, Missouri
Unincorporated communities in Missouri